Alexander House, also known as Churcher House and Gloyd House, is located at 846 F St. in Salida, Colorado.  The Queen Anne style house was built in 1901.  It is significant for its architecture, and was added to the National Register of Historic Places in 2007.

It is a two-story  brick house on a dark stone foundation, with a complex roof and with front and side porches.

See also
National Register of Historic Places listings in Chaffee County, Colorado

References

Houses on the National Register of Historic Places in Colorado
Queen Anne architecture in Colorado
Houses completed in 1901
Houses in Chaffee County, Colorado
National Register of Historic Places in Chaffee County, Colorado